
Gmina Dąbrówno is a rural gmina (administrative district) in Ostróda County, Warmian-Masurian Voivodeship, in northern Poland.

The gmina contains part of the protected area called Dylewo Hills Landscape Park.

Villages
Gmina Dąbrówno contains the villages and settlements of Bartki, Dąbrowa, Dąbrówno, Elgnowo, Fiugajki, Gardyny, Jabłonowo, Jagodziny, Jakubowo, Kalbornia, Leszcz, Lewałd Wielki, Łogdowo, Marwałd, Odmy, Okrągłe, Osiekowo, Ostrowite, Pląchawy, Samin, Saminek, Stare Miasto, Tułodziad, Wądzyn and Wierzbica.

Neighbouring gminas
Gmina Dąbrówno is bordered by the gminas of Działdowo, Grunwald, Kozłowo, Lubawa, Ostróda and Rybno.

References
Polish official population figures 2006

Dabrowno
Ostróda County